Steve Baer (born 1938) is an American inventor and pioneer of passive solar technology. Baer helped popularize the use of zomes. He took a number of solar power patents, wrote a number of books and publicized his work. Baer served on the board of directors of the U.S. Section of the International Solar Energy Society, and on the board of the New Mexico Solar Energy Association. He was the founder, chairman of the board, president, and director of research at Zomeworks Corporation.

Early life

Steve Baer was born in Los Angeles. In his teens while a student at Midland School, he read Lewis Mumford and decided technology needn’t necessarily degrade or complicate people's lives. In the latter 1950s, Baer worked at various jobs and attended Amherst College and UCLA. In 1960, he joined the U.S. Army, being stationed in Germany for three years. He also was married in 1960. After discharge from the Army, he and his wife, Holly settled in Zurich, Switzerland, where he worked as a welder and attended Eidgenössische Technische Hochschule, studying mathematics. Here he became interested in the possibilities of building innovative structures using polyhedra (non-rectangular polyhedrons).

Baer and his wife moved back to the United States, settling in Albuquerque, New Mexico, where Baer initially worked as a welder of trailer frames for the Fruehauf Trailer Services company. He founded the company Zomeworks with Barry Hickman and Ed Heinz. They experimented with constructing buildings of unusual geometries that they came to call zomes, often using heavy sheet metal as the main exterior material. Some of the earliest experiments were carried out in cooperation with members of the intentional communities Drop City and Manara Nueva.

Zomes
Baer had also become interested in using solar energy for direct heating of buildings, inspired by reading Farrington Daniels' Direct Use of the Sun’s Energy. He began to experiment with practical methods, always seeking to simplify his approach as the experiments proceeded.  Steve Baer was a key organizer of an important grassroots Western-American conference, Alloy, focusing on these matters. Because the conference was spotlighted in the Whole Earth Catalog, Baer and Zomeworks became better known among solar enthusiasts in the U.S. Baer also was known as the author of Dome Cookbook and Zome Primer.

In the early years at Zomeworks, Baer was able to work with other innovators and idea people, such as the solar designers Day Chahroudi, Dave Harrison, and Dick Henry. In 1975, Zomeworks published an illustrated book, Sunspots, written by Baer and illustrated by Criss-Cross; focusing on solar-design principles.

One of Zomeworks' inventions was the now-expired patented Beadwall, which consists of two sheets of glass with small styrofoam beads blown in the space between them by an air pump at night to insulate the window areas of the building (the beads being removed by vacuum action in the morning). The design is somewhat similar to the drum wall.

Baer’s approach has been to develop strategies and products that simplify rather than complicate; things that add to, rather than detract from, the self-sufficiency of a building and its occupants. The "Track Rack" solar tracker which Baer and Zomeworks staff developed is a metal-framed passive-solar dynamic mounting for photovoltaic (PV) modules. With an arrangement of cylinders, pistons, and tubing, the device uses the differential pressure and movement of entrapped liquid to enable gravity to turn the rack and follow the sun. Depending on heat and hydraulics, and without motors, gears, or computerized controls, the rack enables the PV module to face the sun ("sunflower-wise") for maximum efficiency. To fit into the developing solar energy industry, Zomeworks has designed and builds several Track Racks to fit all common photovoltaic modules.

Another invention, the Skylight Tracker, has a dual purpose: it shades a skylight for indirect daytime lighting while making electricity from PV panels built into the shading slats.

Besides designing, testing, and fabricating solar-energy equipment, Baer and his company have provided consulting services to architects. Baer's design work was included in the Contemporary Developments in Design Science exhibit at St. John the Divine Cathedral, New York City, in 1995.

Baer's unconventional "zome" building-design approach, with its multi-faceted geometric lines, has been taken up by French builders in the Pyrenees. A 2004 book, Home Work edited by Lloyd Kahn, has a section featuring these buildings.

While Zomeworks has been known mainly for exploring passive solar strategies and equipment, some of the equipment the company has developed more recently, for solar-driven space cooling, has used active-solar principles.

Books

Awards 

 2010 Global Award for Sustainable Architecture

Notes

References

 
 "The Plowboy Interview: Steve and Holly Baer", in The Mother Earth News, issue # 22 - July/August 1973

External links

20th-century American architects
American inventors
Modernist architects
20th-century American mathematicians
21st-century American mathematicians
Solar building designers
1938 births
Living people
Amherst College alumni
University of California, Los Angeles alumni